In digital and analog audio, headroom refers to the amount by which the signal-handling capabilities of an audio system can exceed a designated nominal level. Headroom can be thought of as a safety zone allowing transient audio peaks to exceed the nominal level without damaging the system or the audio signal, e.g., via clipping. Standards bodies differ in their recommendations for nominal level and headroom.

Digital audio 

In digital audio, headroom is defined as the amount by which digital full scale (FS) exceeds the nominal level in decibels (dB). The European Broadcasting Union (EBU) specifies several nominal levels and resulting headroom for different applications.

Analog audio 

In analog audio, headroom can mean low-level signal capabilities as well as the amount of extra power reserve available within the amplifiers that drive the loudspeakers.

Alignment level 
Alignment level is an anchor point 9 dB below the nominal level, a reference level that exists throughout the system or broadcast chain, though it may imply different voltage levels at different points in the analog chain. Typically, nominal (not alignment) level is 0 dB, corresponding to an analog sine wave of voltage of 1.23 volts RMS (+4 dBu or 3.47 volts peak to peak). In the digital realm, alignment level is −18 dBFS.

 AL = analog level
 SPL = sound pressure level

See also 

 A-weighting
 Audio quality measurement
 Equal-loudness contour
 Fletcher–Munson curves
 ITU-R 468 noise weighting
 Loudness war
 Noise measurement
 Programme levels
 Rumble measurement
 Weighting filter

References

Further reading 
BS.1726 "Signal level of digital audio accompanying television in international programme exchange" (2005)
BS.1864 "Operational practices for loudness in the international exchange of digital television programmes" (2010)
BS.1770-3 "Algorithms to measure audio programme loudness and true-peak audio level" (2012)

External links 

 EBU Recommendation R68-2000
 AES Preprint 4828 - Levels in Digital Audio Broadcasting by Neil Gilchrist (not free)
 EBU Recommendation R117-2006 (against loudness war)
 AES Convention Paper 5538 On Levelling and Loudness Problems at Broadcast Studios
 EBU Tech 3282-E on EBU RDAT Tape Levels 
 AES17-1998 (r2004): AES standard method for digital audio engineering -- Measurement of digital audio equipment

Audio engineering
Broadcast engineering
Sound production technology
Sound recording
Sound